The 1999 Torneo Godó was a men's tennis tournament played on Clay in Barcelona, Spain that was part of the International Series Gold of the 1999 ATP Tour. It was the 47th edition of the tournament and was held from 12–18 April.

Seeds
Champion seeds are indicated in bold text while text in italics indicates the round in which those seeds were eliminated.

Draw

Finals

Top half

Bottom half

References

Singles
Godo